Sven Erik Holmes (born 1951) is an American attorney and jurist who served as United States district judge of the United States District Court for the Northern District of Oklahoma.

After leaving the Judiciary, Holmes became the Vice Chairman, Legal, Risk and Regulatory, and Chief Legal Officer for global accounting firm KPMG. At KPMG, he directed the office of general counsel, risk management, government affairs, security, and ethics and compliance programs. He was also counsel to the board of directors and a member of the management committee.  In 2009, Ethicsphere named him one of America's 100 most influential people in business ethics. In 2007, Accounting Today named him one of the "Top 100 Most Influential People in Accounting." Also in 2007, Homes was elected as a fellow of the National Academy of Public Administration. In 2014, National Law Journal named him  "America's 50 Outstanding General Counsel." In 2018, Holmes received the "Scales of Justice Award"  from Equal Justice Works, a "nonprofit organization that brings together an extensive network of law students, lawyers, legal services organizations, and supporters to promote a lifelong commitment to public service and equal justice."

Early life and education

Born in Grand Junction, Colorado, and raised in Bartlesville, Oklahoma, Holmes received his Artium Baccalaureus degree from Harvard University in 1973, a Juris Doctor from the University of Virginia School of Law in 1980, and a Master of Laws (Taxation) from Georgetown University Law Center in 1987. He served as a law clerk to United States District Judge Thomas Rutherford Brett from 1980 to 1981.

Career

Previously, Holmes was a partner at the law firm of Williams & Connolly in Washington DC, was staff director and general counsel to the Senate Select Committee on Intelligence from 1987 to 1989, Vice President of the Baltimore Orioles from 1989 to 1993, and administrative assistant to Governor David L. Boren of Oklahoma from 1975 to 1977. He also taught constitutional law as an adjunct professor at the University of Tulsa College of Law from 1999 to 2005.

He currently sits on the Board of Trustees of St Mary's College of Maryland, and the Board of Trustees of Ford's Theatre.

Federal judicial service

Holmes was nominated by President Bill Clinton on September 22, 1994, to a seat vacated by Judge James O. Ellison. He was confirmed by the United States Senate on October 7, 1994, and received commission on November 21, 1994. In 2001, Chief Justice William Rehnquist appointed him to the Budget Committee for the Judicial Conference of the United States, where he served as vice chair from 2004 to 2005. The Budget Committee consults with Judicial Conference committees to formulate and submit for approval by the Conference's annual budget; it then presents the budget to the United States Congress. He served as chief judge from 2003 to 2005. His resigned from the court on March 13, 2005.

From 2016 to 2018, he served as chairman of the board for the Council for Court Excellence in Washington, D.C.

Personal life

Holmes lives in Washington, D.C. with his wife Lois Romano, a long-time journalist with The Washington Post. They have two daughters.

References

Sources

1951 births
Living people
Harvard University alumni
University of Virginia School of Law alumni
Georgetown University Law Center alumni
University of Tulsa College of Law faculty
Judges of the United States District Court for the Northern District of Oklahoma
United States district court judges appointed by Bill Clinton
KPMG people
People from Grand Junction, Colorado
People from Bartlesville, Oklahoma
20th-century American judges
21st-century American judges